Žanamari Perčić (née Lalić; born 8 September 1981) is a Croatian recording artist, who rose to prominence in 2004 as the first winner of Hrvatski idol, Croatian equivalent of Pop Idol. After her initial rise to fame, she participated in various Croatian reality shows, including the 2013 release Ples sa zvijezdama (Croatian Dancing With The Stars) and Tvoje lice zvuči poznato (Croatian Your Face Sounds Familiar).

Life and career
Žanamari was born and raised in Makarska. In 2001 she obtained a degree in management and moved to Germany, where she released a single "Feels like Heaven" in 2002. She also competed in Deutschland sucht den Superstar, a talent show by RTL Television.

After she won NOVA TV's talent show Hrvatski Idol, Croatian equivalent of the Pop Idol, she competed in Croatian music festivals, winning an award at Zadarfest 2004 for best performance and choreography. She was also in the Croatian Radio Festival 2005 with the single "Bar su suze besplatne", 2008 with "Bijela robinja" and 2009 with her most successful song "Crni leptire". In 2008 and 2010 she performed at CMC festival with singles "Da mi daš još samo jednu noć" and "Ljubav". She has competed in the HRT Dora Eurosong pre-selection in 2005, 2006 and 2007.

Her first solo album Žanamari was released in 2005 by Croatia Records.

From 2008 to 2011 she toured with her supporting band Syndrome and also performed with Matija Dedić Electric Band.

In 2010 she formed a pop-rock band J'Animals. The group got its name from Žanamari’s pseudonym J’Animale.

Wanting to express herself not just as a vocalist but also as a songwriter in composing a new record she co-wrote the first couple of songs with producers Dejan Orešković and Igor Ivanović in the spring of 2010, then recruited guitarist Jura Geci and keyboardist Nikola Vranić, both formerly of Voodoo Lizards, along with drummer Emil Kranjčić, formerly of Dead by Mistake. Together they invited bassist Sebastian Jurić from Sane and guitarist Gordan Dragić from Skaut who played acoustic shows with Žanamari during her solo career. Dragić soon became a major songwriter for the band's debut album together with Žanamari and the rest of the band collaborated on the arrangements.

They released a video for their first single Nije napola in April 2011, then performed with their second single Oteti pa vraćeni at CMC Festival in June 2011, and along with the third hit single Kreten pomalo that came out in November 2011, the new album Druga vrsta was released under Croatia Records. The album also contains three bonus hit singles from Žanamaris' solo career: Crni leptire, Ljubav and Ne pitaj me, furthermore spawned another two new hit singles Krugovi and Dijagnoza, promoted at the CMC Festival in June 2012. The band also rewrote their existing hit singles in English, starting with songs Let Me Burn, The Master and The Wall Of End and published them independently on their Soundcloud profile.

In August 2012 bassist Tomislav Šušak from Vatra and Skaut, formerly of Kinoklub and Ramirez, join them on tour and shortly after in the place of Jura Geci came a new guitarist Dario Bulatović, known for his engagement in band Violate.

In 2012 they toured with the Croatian band Goran Bare i Majke and released a live tour follow footage video single Gentleman in January 2013. In May 2013 they supported Joe Satriani in Zagreb and Ljubljana on the Unstoppable Momentum World Tour and in the summer of 2013 successfully promoted their brand new single Kao da nema sutra on two biggest rock festivals in the region EXIT Festival (Novi Sad) and Arsenal Fest (Kragujevac).

In September 2013, since Dario Bulatović and Tomislav Šušak left the band due to engagement in their own projects,  guitarist Rene Coner and bassist Mario Perčić joined J'Animals. In December 2013 they released new official single Oči u oči/The Game of Shadows and announced the official video premiere for January 2014.

In June 2014 Žanamari married Mario Perčić and changed her last name to Perčić. In May 2015 their first daughter Gabriela was born.

After a short pregnancy leave in December 2015 Žanamari returned to her solo career with her new single Tako blizu as a part of the 63rd Zagrebački festival and announced her new mainstream pop music era with a song U ratu i ljubavi feat. Aleksandra Kovač which hit half a million YouTube views. The video was produced by her own music and video production company V.R.H. Productions, with her husband Mario Perčić as video director.

In July 2016 she promoted Isti se prepoznaju at Splitski festival. That led to her performing in the TV show Tvoje Lice Zvuči Poznato (Your Face Sounds Familiar) aired by Nova TV in autumn of 2016. In 2017 she released her song Pina Colada feat. Joshua Macks. After the song hit first million YouTube views, they released another duet Licemjeri. In January 2018 Žanamari released the single Život je lijep and in one week of airplay entered the Croatian official radio pop chart as the highest new entry. Žanamari and Joshua Macks had a hit in the summer of 2018 with the single Romantika, followed by Žanamari's collaboration with DJ ARIEN on a song Uragan and later on a successful duet with Bosnian pop artist Igor Vukojević on a ballad Srce ne pita. Her latest single is Ubijaš.

Discography

Solo
Albums
Žanamari (16 August 2005)

Maxi single
Crni leptire (15 July 2009)

Singles
Znam feat. Deen (2005)
Ljubav za jednu noć (DORA, 2006)
Jedino moje (DORA, 2007)
Trag na usnama feat. Mima (Budva, 2007)
Da mi daš još samo jednu noć (CMC, 2008)
Bijela robinja (HRF, 2008)
Sinoć nisi bila tu feat. Kemal Monteno (2008)
Ljubav (CMC, 2010)
Ne pitaj me (Šansona Šibenik, 2010)
I Feel Alone (2010)
U ovoj sobi feat. Hard Time (2013)
Tako blizu (2015)
U ratu i ljubavi feat. Aleksandra Kovač (2016)
Isti se prepoznaju (Splitski Festival, 2016)
Ajde, Ajde (2016)
Sklonište od leda (2016)
Pina Colada feat. Joshua Macks (2017)
Licemjeri feat. Joshua Macks (2017)
Život je lijep (2018)
Kraj programa (2018)
Romantika feat. Joshua Macks (2018)
Uragan feat. ARIEN (2018)
Srce na pita feat. Igor Vukojević (2019)
Ubijaš (2019)

With J'Animals
 Druga vrsta (2011)
 Kao da nema sutra (2013)
 Oči u oči (2013)

References

External links
Official website
Official facebook page
Official SoundCloud
Croatia Records
U ratu i ljubavi feat. Aleksandra Kovač (Music video)
Tako blizu (Music video)
Kreten pomalo (Music video)
Dijagnoza (Music video)
U ovoj sobi Žanamari feat. Hard Time (Music video)
Kao da nema sutra (Music video)
Soundguardian Music Magazine (interview)
Index.hr Croatian News Web Portal (Article)
MTV Music Television (Web music video premiere)
Nocturne Magazin Serbian Online Music Magazine (Article)
Nocturne Magazin Serbian Online Music Magazine (Album Review)
Tportal.hr Croatian News Web Portal (Album Review)
Story.hr Croatian Celebrity Magazine (Article)
Gloria Magazine (article)
IN Magazin Nova TV Television show (reportage)

1981 births
Living people
21st-century Croatian women singers
Idols (TV series) winners
People from Makarska